The 1965 Michigan State Spartans football team represented the Michigan State University in the 1965 Big Ten Conference football season. The Spartans won the Big Ten Championship and competed in the 1966 Rose Bowl, losing to UCLA. Despite the loss, the Spartans shared the national championship with Alabama. Michigan State was selected national champion by UPI/coaches, Berryman, Billingsley, DeVold, Dunkel, FB News, Helms, Litkenhous, NFF, Poling, Sagarin, and Sagarin (ELO-Chess) and also co-national champion by FW. Both Alabama and Michigan State were Consensus National Champions for the season.

Schedule

Statistics
The 7-0 conference record earned Michigan State its first undisputed Big Ten Conference Football Championship in school history. [4]
Big Ten Conference Scoring Champion – Clinton Jones (7 games) 11 touchdowns, 1 PAT, total 68 points
Big Ten Conference Team Stat Champions - [6]
MSU Rushing Offense – (7 games) 1,746 yards, 249.4 yards per game average
MSU Total Offense – (7 games) 2,640 yards, 377.1 yards per game average
MSU Scoring Offense – (7 games) 203 points, 29 points per game average
MSU Rushing Defense – (7 games) 242 yards allowed, 34.6 yards per game average
MSU Total Defense – (7 games) allowed 181.7 yards per game average
MSU Scoring Defense – (7 games) allowed 56 points, 8 points per game average
MSU Punt Returns – (7 games) 10.3 yards per return average

Team Leaders - [6]
Rushing – Clinton Jones (10 games) 787 yards, 4.8 yards per carry average
Passing – Stephen Juday (10 games) 1,173 yards, 52.9% completion pct., 7 touchdowns
Receiving – Eugene Washington (9 games) 40 receptions, 638 yards, 16 yard average, 4 touchdowns
Scoring – Clinton Jones (10 games) 12 touchdowns, 1 PAT, 74 total points
All-purpose yards – Clinton Jones (10 games) 787 rushing, 308 receiving, 65 kickoff return, total yards 1,160 
Interceptions – Donald Japinga 4 interceptions for 44 return yards
Punting – Richard Kenney 35 punts for 1,239 yards, 35.4 yards per punt average
Punt returns – Drake Garrett 18 returns for 210 yards, 11.7 yards per return average
Kick off returns – Drake Garrett 9 returns for 128 yards, 14.2 yards per return average
Team MVP Steve Juday finished 6th in Heisman Trophy balloting and Clint Jones finished 13th to winner Mike Garrett USC.
The Cleveland Touchdown Club named Clint Jones as "Most Outstanding College Player".

Personnel
Offensive Lineup [5]
End #80 Jim Proebstle, #86 Tony Angel
Tackle #67 Jerry West
Guard #63 Norm Jenkins,  #70 Fred Convertini
Center #50 Boris Dimitroff, #59 Walt Forman
Guard #58 John Karpinski
Tackle #57 Joe Przybycki,  #68 Dave Techlin
Split End #84 Gene Washington, 
Quarterback #23 Steve Juday, #16 Jimmy Raye, 
Left Halfback #34 Dwight Lee, #33 Mitch Pruiett, #32 James Garrett
Right Halfback #26 Clint Jones, #39 Drake Garrett
Fullback #44 Eddie Cotton, #45 Bob Apisa
Punter/Place kicker #42 Richard Kenney 
Defensive Lineup [5]
End #95 Charles "Bubba" Smith, #82 George Chatlos
Tackle #53 Alton "Buddy" Owens, #55 Pat Gallinagh, #79 Jack Schinderle
Guard #51 Harold Lucas, 
Tackle #65 Don Bierowicz, #74 Don Weatherspoon
End #85 Bob Viney, #36 Phil Hoag
Linebacker #61 Ron Goovert, #62 Bob Brawley
Linebacker #71 Charles Thornhill, #59 Walt Forman
RoverBack #90 George Webster, #33 Mitch Pruiett
D-Halfback  #20 Jim Summers, #29 Jerry Jones
D-Halfback  #14 Don Japinga, #31 Sterling Armstrong
Safety #38 Jess Phillips

Senior Team players drafted into the NFL[3]

Senior Team players drafted into the AFL (American Football League) [6]

Harold Lucas, Tackle, Round 3 Boston Patriots. Alton Buddy Owens, Guard, Round 16 Boston Patriots.

Senior Lettermen include; Tony Angel, Don Bierowicz, Eddie Cotton, Boris Dimitroff, James Garrett, Ron Goovert, Don Japinga, Steve Juday, John Karpinski, Harold Lucas, Buddy Owens, Jim Proebstle, Jack Schinderle, Bob Viney, Don Weatherspoon, Dugald Tryon (Manager). [6]

All Big Ten Team include: 1st Team – Gene Washington, Clint Jones, Charles "Bubba" Smith, George Webster, Steve Juday, Ron Goovert, Don Japinga, Harold Lucas. 2nd Team – John Karpinski, Bob Apisa, Jerry West, Boris Dimitroff. Honorable Mention – Bob Viney, Don Bierowicz, Buddy Owens, David Techlin, Dwight Lee.[6]

Junior Lettermen include: Bob Brawley, Fred Convertini, Walt Forman, Pat Gallinagh, Phil Hoag, Clint Jones, Jerry Jones, Dick Kenney, Larry Lukasik #17 QB-DB, John Mullen #15 QB, Bubba Smith, Jim Summers, Charles Thornhill, Gene Washington, George Webster, Jerry West.[6]

Sophomore Lettermen include: Bob Apisa, Sterling Armstrong, George Chatlos, Drake Garrett, Norm Jenkins, Dwight Lee, Jess Phillips, Mitch Pruiett, Joe Przybycki, Jimmy Raye, Dave Techlin.[6]

Non-letter players include: Frank Altimore #37 RB, *Thomas Ammirato #69 OG, *Michael Bradley #47 LB, Phil Brittain #96 DT, William Bruce #21 FB, *Anthony Conti #75 LB, Emil Demko #41 DT, Michael Dissinger #93 OE, *Peter Dotlich #89 OE, William Grimes #97 DE, *John Grogan #30 OHB, Marty Hain #27 OHB, *Maurice Haynes #87 OE, Kenneth Heft #28 OHB, *James Hoye #35 OHB, *John Kettunen #81 OE, *Robert Lange #83 OE, *Charles Lowther #24 QB, *Russell Malone #88 OT, Clinton Meadows #98 DT, Eddy McLoud #46 DT, Dennis Miller #73 DT, Ernest Pasteur #43 DE, Wade Payne #40 DHB, *Ronald Ranieri #54 C, Richard Reahm #66 DG, Keith Redd #49 C, *Jeffrey Richardson #64 C, *Anthony Rutherford #56 LB, Thomas Skidmore #72 OT, *Lawrence Smith #52 C, Roger Stewart #22 DHB, Solomon Townsend #77 OT, John Whalen #48 OG, Michael Woodward #94 DT.  * indicates appeared in game. [5],[6],[7]

Game scoring summary

Sept.18 @ East Lansing, MI

UCLA 3 Michigan State 13

MSU Apisa 21 yd run, Kenney kick

MSU Kenney 34 yd Field Goal

UCLA Zimmerman 37 yd Field Goal

MSU Kenney 23 yd Field Goal

Sept.25 @ University Park, PA

Michigan State 23 Penn State 0

MSU Kenney 24 yd Field Goal

MSU Apisa 35 yd run, Kenney kick

MSU Juday 4 yd run, Kenney kick

MSU Kenney 29 yd Field Goal

MSU Kenney 36 yd Field Goal

Oct. 2 @ East Lansing, Michigan

Illinois 12 Michigan State 22

MSU Kenney 47 yd Field Goal

ILL Grabowski 7 yd run, Custardo kick

ILL Custardo 34 yd Field Goal

MSU Jones 13 yd run, pass failed

ILL Safety (J. Phillips tackled in endzone on punt return)

MSU Apisa 10 yd run, Kenney kick

MSU Washington 7 yd pass from Juday, kick failed

Oct. 9 @ Ann Arbor

Michigan State 24 Michigan 7

MSU Juday 1 yd run, kick failed

UM Gabler 1 yd run, Sygar kick

MSU Kenney 20 yd Field Goal

MSU Jones 10 yd run, pass failed

MSU Kenney 35 yd Field Goal

MSU Apisa 39 yd run

Oct. 16 @ East Lansing, Michigan

Ohio State 7 Michigan State 32

MSU Jones 80 yd run, Kenney kick

MSU Kenney 35 yd Field Goal

MSU Safety (OSU QB sacked in endzone by R. Goovert)

MSU Jones 12 yd pass from Juday, pass failed

OSU Fontes 36 yd pass from Unverferth, Funk kick

MSU Apisa 1 yd run, Kenney kick

MSU Lowther 6 yd run, Kenney kick

Oct. 23 @ West Lafayette, IND

Michigan State 14 Purdue 10

PUR Griese 20 yd Field Goal

PUR Finley 7 yd pass from Griese, Griese kick

MSU Apisa 1 yd run, Jones pass from Juday

MSU Jones, run failed

Oct. 30 @ East Lansing, Michigan (Homecoming)

Northwestern 7 Michigan State 49

NW Gates fumble recovery in endzone, Dickie kick

MSU Apisa 1 yd run, run failed

MSU Jones 5 yd run, Apisa run

MSU Apisa 2 yd run, Kenney kick

MSU Apisa 1 yd run, Kenney kick

MSU Jones 10 yd pass from Juday, Kenney kick

MSU Lee 1 yd run, Kenney kick

MSU Raye 45 yd run, Kenney kick

Nov. 6 @ Iowa City, Iowa

Michigan State 35 Iowa 0

MSU Jones 19 yd run, Kenney kick

MSU Jones 6 yd run, Kenney kick

MSU Jones 3 yd run, Kenney kick

MSU Jones 4 yd run, Kenney kick

MSU Lee 14 yd run, Kenney kick

Nov. 13 @ East Lansing, Michigan

Indiana 13 Michigan State 27

MSU Kenney 21 yd Field Goal

MSU Washington 27 yd pass from Juday, Kenney kick

IND Mailichak 10 yd pass from Stravroff, Kornowa kick

IND Stravroff 1 yd run, kick failed

MSU Washington 43 yd pass from Juday, Kenney kick

MSU Kenney 27 yd Field Goal

MSU Washington 4 yd pass from Juday, Kenney kick

Nov. 20 @ South Bend, Indiana

Michigan State 12 Notre Dame 3

ND Ivan 32 yd Field Goal

MSU Jones 3 yd run, kick failed

MSU Lee 19 yd pass from Juday, pass failed

Jan. 1, 1966 @ Pasadena, California Rose Bowl

Michigan State 12 UCLA 14

UCLA Beban 1 yd run, Zimmerman kick

UCLA Beban 1 yd run, Zimmerman kick

MSU Apisa 38 yd run, pass failed

MSU Juday 1 yd run, run failed

1965 SEASON STATISTICS [4]

Team

Net Yards Rushing ..... MSU 2,369;   Opponents 456

Number of Plays ........ MSU 547 ;     Opponents 338

Net Yards Passing ..... MSU 1,186 ;  Opponents 1,243

Passes Attempted ..... MSU 170;    Opponents 234

Passes Completed .... MSU 90  ;      Opponents 106

Passes had Intercepted MSU 8 ;      Opponents 17

Touchdown Passes ... MSU 7  ;        Opponents 3

Total Offense

(Net gain) ................. MSU 3,555; Opponents 1,699

Number of plays ....... MSU 717;  Opponents 572

First Downs (total) .... MSU 191;  Opponents 111

Rushing ................... MSU 128 ; Opponents 40

Passing ................... MSU 59 ;  Opponents 60

Penalty .................... MSU 4 ;    Opponents 11

Interception returns ..MSU 17 ;  Opponents 8

Yards on return  .......MSU 146 ;  Opponents 43

Punts (number) ....... MSU 35 ; Opponents 69

Avg. per punt .......... MSU 38.3 ; Opponents 37.7

Punts had blocked ...MSU 0 ;    Opponents 1

Punt returns .............MSU 37 ;   Opponents 11

Yards punt return .....MSU 378 ;  Opponents 38

Kickoff returns ..........MSU 17  ; Opponents 51

Yards KO return .......MSU 286 ; Opponents 983

Fumbles ...................MSU 20  ; Opponents 20

Fumbles lost ............MSU 13  ; Opponents 8

Penalties .................MSU 49  ; Opponents 35

Yards lost penalties .MSU 476 ; Opponents 264

Scoring

Touchdowns ...............MSU 32 ;     Opponents 7

PAT by kick ............... MSU 20-23 ;  Opponents 6-7

PAT by run ................ MSU 1       ;  Opponents 0

PAT by pass .............  MSU 1       ;  Opponents 0

Field Goals ............... MSU 11-18 ; Opponents 4-6

Safeties .................... MSU 1      ;  Opponents 1

Total points ..............  MSU 251  ;  Opponents 62

Individual

Rushing   ----         Net yards –   AVG. –    TD

Clint Jones –          787yds. --         4.8 --        10

Bob Apisa –          666yds.--         5.5 --          9

Dwight Lee –         411yds. --         3.8 --          2

Jimmy Raye –        192yds.--        8.8 --          1

Steve Juday  –       133yds. --        2.1 --          2

Eddie Cotton  –       74yds.--         2.6 --         0

Drake Garrett  –      34yds. --         2.5 --         0

James Garrett   –    32yds. --         5.3 --          0

John Mullen        –   26yds.--          5.2  --        0

Charles Lowther  –    6yds.--          6.0  --        1

Mitch Pruiett         –   6yds.--          6.0  --         0

John Grogan         –  2yds.--         2.0 --         0

Passing  ----   Completions --             Yards -    PCT. -  TD - Interceptions                                     .

Steve Juday -  89 of 168–1,173yds. --    53% --     7 TD—7 INT.

Jimmy Raye   ---  1 of 2 --          13yds. --      50% --     0 TD—1 INT.

Receiving  ----              Yards –  Catches -TD

Gene Washington –    638yds. --       40–4

Clint Jones –               308yds. --       26–2

Bob Apisa –                 93yds. --        6 --        0

Dwight Lee  –                39yds. --        6 --        1

Jim Proebstle  –           43yds.--       4  --        0

Drake Garrett –            18yds. --      3  --        0

Tony Angel  –               24yds. --       2  --       0

Maurice Haynes –     13yds. --      1 --       0

Eddie Cotton –               8yds.--      1 --        0

Mitch Pruiett –             2yds. --       1  --       0

Punting

Richard Kenney –            35–1,239 yds. --      38.3 avg.

Punt Returns

Drake Garrett –             18–210 yds. --        11.7 avg.

Jess Phillips –                11–89 yds. --          9.0 avg.

Jim Summers –                2  --         37 yds. --           18.5 avg.

Don Japinga –                 5 --         34 yds. --            6.8 avg.

Mitch Pruiett –                1 --            8 yds. --           8.0 avg.

Kickoff Returns

Drake Garrett –             9  --         128yds—14.2 avg.

Dwight Lee –                  3 --            71yds—23.7 avg.

Clint Jones –                  2 --           65 yds—16.3 avg.

Jess Phillips –               1 --           22 yds—22.0 avg.

Scoring  ----                    TD ---         PAT ---          FG ---      Total points

Clint Jones –                12–1 --               0 --                74 pts.

Bob Apisa –                  9 --            1 --              0 --               56 pts.

Dick Kenney –             0 --          20 of 23–11 of 17–53 pts.

Gene Washington –     4  --           0 --               0 --               24 pts.

Dwight Lee –                3  --           0 --               0 --               18 pts.

Steve Juday –              2 --            0 --              0 --                 12 pts.

Charles Lowther –        1 --             0 --              0 --                 6 pts.

Jimmy Raye –             1 --             0 --             0 --                 6 pts.

Safety ---------                                                                           2 pts.

Interception returns

Don Japinga –             4 --       44yds

Jim Summers –             3 --       36yds

Jess Phillips –              3 --       11yds

Charlie Thornhill –      2 --       37yds

Buddy Owens –         1 --        14yds

Ron Goovert  –             1 --         4yds

Bob Viney –                  1 --         0yds

George Webster –        1 --         0yds

Mitch Pruiett –              1 --       0yds

Post-season recognition include:  Stephen Juday, National Football Hall of Fame Graduate Fellowship Award, Big Ten Golden Helmet Award.

James Proebstle, Dr. John Hannah Award – (perseverance).  Robert Viney, Biggie Munn Award – (inspirational).  Donald Japinga, Forest Akers Award – (dedication).

Stephen Juday, Potsy Ross Trophy – (scholar-athlete) and Governor of Michigan Award (MVP).  Harold Lucas, Danzinger Award – (Outstanding Detroit-area player).

Drake Garrett, Oil Can Award – (humor). Spartans in All-Star Games – Steve Juday and Harold Lucas, Hula Bowl-Honolulu,HI.[4]

Reference:

Miscellaneous

Four players from the 1965 Michigan State team have been inducted into the College Football Hall of Fame: roverback George Webster (1987), defensive end Bubba Smith (1988), split end Gene Washington (2011), and halfback Clinton Jones (2015). In addition, athletic director Clarence Munn (1959) and head coach Duffy Daugherty (1984) were also inducted.

Head Coach Hugh Duffy Daugherty (11 seasons, 1954–1964) had a record of 63-34-3 in the 100 games prior to the 1965 season, with 2 National Championships 1955 and 1957. He was named "National Coach of the Year"  by the Football Writer's Association at the conclusion of the 1965 season for the second time (1955). The Sporting News, New York Daily News, Football News, and The Washington Touchdown Club also named Duffy as "Coach of the Year ".[4]  The MSU 1965 assistant coaches: Hank Bullough Defensive Line, Vince Carillot Defensive Backs, Dan Boisture Offensive Backs, Al Dorrow Asst. Backfield, Cal Stoll Ends, Gordon Serr Offensive Line, Ed Rutherford Freshman and Gayle Robinson served as team trainer. [6]

First Team All-Americans: Bob Apisa fullback, Ron Goovert linebacker, Clint Jones halfback, Steve Juday quarterback, Harold Lucas middle guard, Charles "Bubba" Smith defensive end, Gene Washington split end, George Webster rover back. [6]

Team Captains Don Japinga DB, Steve Juday QB,  along with DT Donald Bierowicz and TE James Proebstle earned Academic All Big Ten Conference honors. [6]

The Spartans of East Lansing, Michigan wearing green football helmets with a white stripe, white number decals at the back and white Spartan head decals on the side; and green jerseys (home games) with white numbers front and back with MICHIGAN STATE in white letters on front; and white pants with green belts and trim. For away games, jerseys are white with all lettering in green.[4]

MSU had an average home attendance of 69,459 which ranked #3 in NCAA.[6]

In the schedule below you will notice the Spartans were not ranked in the Associated Press (AP) preseason  "Top 10" poll released September 13, 1965. The AP preseason poll did rank opponents Notre Dame #3, Michigan #4, Purdue #9, Ohio State #10. All were defeated by the combined score of 82-27. (3 of which were away games) The Spartan defense held Michigan, Ohio State and Notre Dame to negative rushing yards.

The Touchdown Club of Columbus, Ohio named Michigan State "The Best Football Team with the Most Demanding Schedule"  known as the Robert Zuppke Award. The Helms Athletic Foundation, The Sporting News, and the Washington Touchdown Club named the Spartans "Team of the Year". The National Football Foundation and Hall of Fame presented the Spartans with the MacArthur Bowl. United Press International (UPI) Poll of College Football Coaches ranked Michigan State #1 in their final season poll. The Football Writers Association named MSU and Alabama as co-champions with the Grantland Rice Award.[4]

Since 1959 The MacArthur Bowl is presented annually by the National Football Foundation & College Hall of Fame to the outstanding college football team of the season. [9]

The Helms Athletic Foundation of Los Angeles, founded by Paul Helms and Bill Schroeder operated Halls of Fame for a variety of sports, named All-American teams for college football and basketball, and selected a college football national champion. [10]

References

Michigan State
Michigan State Spartans football seasons
College football national champions
Big Ten Conference football champion seasons
Michigan State Spartans football